Autostrada A52, also called tangenziale Nord di Milano, is a motorway that connects the northern suburban area of Milan, managed by Milano Serravalle – Milano Tangenziali. On 29 March 2005, the second section to the west was opened, not connected to the original A52, connecting the SS 33 and the A8.

References

Transport infrastructure completed in 1994
1994 establishments in Italy
A52
Transport in Milan
Ring roads in Italy